Saw Lu (also spelled Sawlu; also known as Min Lulin, ; 19 April 1049 –  21 April 1084) was king of Pagan dynasty of Burma (Myanmar) from 1077 to 1084. He inherited from his father Anawrahta the Pagan Empire, the first ever unified kingdom of Burma (Myanmar) but proved an inexperienced ruler. In 1082, he faced a rebellion in Lower Burma, and was captured c. April 1083. He was later killed in captivity about a year later.

Early life
Saw Lu was born to King Anawrahta and Queen Agga Mahethi, Queen of the Southern Palace. The Burmese chronicles do not agree on the dates regarding his life and reign. The table below lists the dates given by the four main chronicles, and scholarship.

Moreover, the chronicles do not agree whether or not Saw Lu was older than Kyansittha, Anawrahta's other son. According to early chronicles, Kyansittha was older (20 years per Zata) and (two years per Maha Yazawin). However, later chronicles Yazawin Thit and Hmannan say Saw Lu was older by about one and two years, respectively.

At any rate, Anawrahta made Saw Lu the heir presumptive even though Anawrahta already had a son, Kyansittha by a minor queen whom he had discarded. Saw Lu was brought up by a Mon lady of noble birth. He grew up with the wet nurse's son Yamankan, who became a close friend of his. Saw Lu was not interested in running the kingdom, and never participated in any of his father's military campaigns. He viewed Kyansittha, his half-brother and general in the Pagan army who was extremely popular with the people, with suspicion.

Reign
Saw Lu ascended to the Pagan throne on 11 April 1077 after his father Anawrahta had died under mysterious circumstances. When he became king, he married his father's Mon queen Manisanda (Khin U) and made her the chief queen. His regnal title was Śrīvájrabharaṇatribupati.

To run the Mon-speaking territories in the south, he appointed his trusted childhood friend Yamankan, an ethnic Mon. To administer the upcountry, Saw Lu, at the urging of Primate Shin Arahan, reluctantly brought back Kyansittha, who had been sent to exile by Anawrahta for his affair with Manisanda. However, Saw Lu soon had to banish Kyansittha again (this time to Dala near Yangon) because the latter renewed his affair with Manisanda.

Mon rebellion
As governor of Pegu, Yamankan continued to visit Saw Lu at Pagan. Knowing the inexperience of his childhood friend well, Yamankan decided to rebel. The chronicles describe the final breach between Saw Lu and Yamankan in a dramatic way. The two were playing a game of dice, and Yamankan won. As Yamankan romped about in joy at his victory, Saw Lu taunted him, "If you are so clever, why don't you rebel against me?"

Yamankan went back to Pegu, and revolted. In late 1082, he sailed up the Irrawaddy river with his army, and took a position on an island a few miles below Pagan. Saw Lu recalled Kyansittha from exile, and gave him the command of Pagan army. They marched south and halted near Myingun (near Magwe). Yamankan's army was stationed at Thayet. Saw Lu was impatient and against Kyansittha's warning, attacked. But Yamankan had expected such an attack and prepared his positions well. Saw Lu's army was routed and the king was taken prisoner. According to the chronicle Zatadawbon Yazawin, the battle between Saw Lu and Yamankan took place in November 1082.

Death
Kyansittha tried to rescue but Saw Lu refused to be rescued. His last fatal miscalculation that Kyansittha would kill him to get the throne but his friend Yamankan would not. He was killed by Yamankan to prevent the further rescue attempts. According to scholarship, he likely died c. April 1084 before 21 April 1084. Yamankan himself was ambushed by the sniper bow-shot of Nga Sin the hunter and died. Later Kyansittha became the third king of the Pagan Empire.

According to Zatadawbon Yazawin, Kyansittha and Yamankan fought a battle c. April 1083 (Kason of 445 ME). The battle may not be the final battle in which Yamankan was slain since Zata says Saw Lu died in 1084 after having reigned seven years. However, other chronicles (Hmannan and Yazawin Thit) say he reigned only for five years, followed by an interregnum that lasted till 1084—implying that the king died in 1083.

Saw Lu was so incompetent that it says much for the genius of the father that his kingdom survived the test.

See also
Sawlumin inscription

Notes

References

Bibliography
 
 
 
 
 
 
 
 
 

Pagan dynasty
1049 births
1084 deaths
11th-century Burmese monarchs